Kobe Korean Senior High School (神戸朝鮮高級学校 Kōbe Chōsen Kōkyūgakkō; 고베조선고급학교) is a Korean heritage high school in Tarumi-ku, Kobe, Japan.

See also
 Education in Kobe

References

External links
 Kobe Korean Senior High School 

High schools in Hyōgo Prefecture
International schools in Kobe